Shelby Holliday is a senior video reporter for the Wall Street Journal, based in New York City, and focusing on that region, on business and finance, and on politics (as of September 2022).

Early Years 
Holliday grew up in Denver, Colorado, having been born there in 1985. Prevented from playing basketball at the University of San Diego by a freshman-year back injury, she went on to anchor and co-produce USDtv (the university television station) and intern at the local NBC affiliate. She graduated with a degree in business administration, in 2008.

Career 

Holliday began her career as a reporter and producer for the college news networks Palestra.net. In her reporting there, she covered cases of alleged voter fraud in Ohio. Prior to joining Channel One News in 2010, she went on from Palestra to repor[t] for UWIRE, a college news network partnered with News Corp... appea[r] on various Fox News and Fox Business platforms, and...  co-hos[t] the live-streaming Fox News "Strategy Room" leading up to the 2008 presidential election.
 
She worked at and anchored for Channel One News in the period of 2010–2014, "where she traveled around the world to educate America's youth about current events and international affairs". There, she covered international news events including Typhoon Haiyan in the Philippines, Nelson Mandela's funeral in South Africa, and military tribunals at the Guantanamo Bay detention center. Holliday won a Bronze Telly award for Channel One in 2014 for reporting on China's rise to global power, reported on and produced by Holliday as a six-part series.

In 2014, Holliday became a reporter for Bloomberg Television, working in New York City. As of September 2022, she is a senior video reporter reporter for the Wall Street Journal, based in New York City, and focusing on that region, on business and finance, and on politics.

References

Living people
American women television journalists
Year of birth missing (living people)